Phillip S. Cary (born 1958) is an American philosopher who serves as a professor at Eastern University with a concentration on Augustine of Hippo and the history of the reception of Augustine's thought. Born on June 10, 1958, he received his Doctor of Philosophy degree from Yale University under Nicholas Wolterstorff. He has written a number of books, including three published by Oxford University Press. Additionally, he has provided lectures on the history of Christian theology as well as on major figures in ecclesiastical history for The Teaching Company. Cary is a former Chair of the Augustine and Augustinianisms Program Unit of the American Academy of Religion (AAR) and the current editor of the academic journal Pro Ecclesia.

Selected publications
 The Meaning of Protestant Theology: Luther, Augustine, and the Gospel That Gives Us Christ. Baker Academic, 2019. .
 Good News for Anxious Christians: 10 Practical Things You Don't Have to Do. Brazos Press, 2010. .
 Jonah. Brazos Theological Commentary on the Bible. Grand Rapids, Mich.: Brazos Press. 2008. .
 Outward Signs: The Powerlessness of External Things in Augustine's Thought. Oxford University Press, 2008. .
 Inner Grace: Augustine in the Traditions of Plato and Paul. Oxford University Press, 2008. .
 Augustine's Invention of the Inner Self: The Legacy of a Christian Platonist. Oxford University Press, 2003. .

References

External links
 Cary's Worldcat identity
 Brief biography (The Teaching Company)
 "Why Luther Is Not Quite Protestant?" Pro Ecclesia. Fall 2005. pp. 447–486.

1958 births
21st-century American philosophers
21st-century Anglicans
American Anglicans
Anglican philosophers
Eastern University (United States)
Living people
Philosophers from Pennsylvania
Washington University in St. Louis alumni
Yale Divinity School alumni
Augustine scholars